Nieciecz-Dwór is a village in the administrative district of Gmina Sabnie, within Sokołów County, Masovian Voivodeship, in east-central Poland.

The village has a population of 180.

References

Villages in Sokołów County